Classon is a surname of Swedish origin, the patronymic form of the name Claes (the Swedish equivalent of Claus). Notable people with the surname include:

David G. Classon (1870–1930), American politician
Krister Classon (born 1955), Swedish comedian and actor
Conor Classon, Irish sportsperson

See also
Classon's Bridge, bridge over the River Dodder in Dublin, Ireland
Classon Avenue (IND Crosstown Line), a station on the New York City subway

References